Gevorg Gharibyan (born 11 December 1994) is an Armenian Greco-Roman wrestler. He won the gold medal in the 60 kg event at the 2020 European Wrestling Championships held in Rome, Italy.

Career 

Gharibyan won the gold medal in the 55 kg event at the 2012 European Juniors Wrestling Championships held in Zagreb, Croatia. He also won the gold medal in the 60 kg event at the 2014 European Juniors Wrestling Championships held in Warsaw, Poland.

In 2017, he competed in the 59 kg event at the European Wrestling Championships held in Novi Sad, Serbia. The following year, he competed in the 60 kg event at the 2018 World Wrestling Championships held in Budapest, Hungary. In 2019, he competed in the 60 kg event at the European Wrestling Championships held in Bucharest, Romania and in the 60 kg event at the World Wrestling Championships held in Nur-Sultan, Kazakhstan.

In 2020, he won the gold medal in the 60 kg event at the European Wrestling Championships held in Rome, Italy. In the final, he defeated Kerem Kamal of Turkey. In the same year, he competed in the 63 kg event at the 2020 Individual Wrestling World Cup held in Belgrade, Serbia. In March 2021, he competed at the European Qualification Tournament in Budapest, Hungary hoping to qualify for the 2020 Summer Olympics in Tokyo, Japan. He was eliminated in his second match. In October 2021, he lost his bronze medal match in the 60 kg event at the World Wrestling Championships held in Oslo, Norway.

He won one of the bronze medals in the 60 kg event at the 2022 European Wrestling Championships held in Budapest, Hungary.

Achievements

References

External links 

 

Living people
1994 births
Place of birth missing (living people)
Armenian male sport wrestlers
European Wrestling Championships medalists
European Wrestling Champions
20th-century Armenian people
21st-century Armenian people